Rabocentus was a Thracian chief of the Bessi mentioned by Cicero.

See also 
List of rulers of Thrace and Dacia
1st-century BC rulers in Europe

References 

Thracian kings